The heraldic ensigns of the Romanian Police consist of the following elements: large blue shield with a crusader golden eagle, having its head turned to the right, red peak and claws, open wings, holding a silver sword in its right claw; the green olive branch, symbolizing peace and order, replacing the mace from the coat of arms of the country. The small blue shield, placed on the eagle’s chest, having a golden balance having its scales well-balanced, in the upper part, and, in its lower part, two Roman fasces, crossed and natural; at the bottom of the external shield, on a white scarf, the motto of the ministry is written in black: .

The balance symbolizes the social justice, highlighting the competence of the institution in the field of law enforcement. The Roman fasces evoke the attributions of the Romanian Police in a lawful state, as a guarantee of public order.

References
  Website of the Romanian Ministry of Interior and Administrative Reform
  Website of the Romanian Ministry of Interior and Administrative Reform

Police
Coat of Arms